Thomas Knox (born 5 September 1939) is a Scottish former professional footballer who played in the Football League for Chelsea, Mansfield Town, Newcastle United and Northampton Town.

References

1939 births
Living people
Scottish footballers
Association football forwards
English Football League players
East Stirlingshire F.C. players
Chelsea F.C. players
Newcastle United F.C. players
Northampton Town F.C. players
St Mirren F.C. players
Hillingdon Borough F.C. players
Tonbridge Angels F.C. players
Basingstoke Town F.C. players
Footballers from Glasgow